Lore Gillis (born ) is a Belgian female former volleyball player, playing as an outside hitter. She was part of the Belgium women's national volleyball team.

She competed at the 2007 and 2013 Women's European Volleyball Championship. On club level she played for VC Oudegem.

References

External links
http://www.scoresway.com/?sport=volleyball&page=player&id=7901
http://www.cev.lu/Competition-Area/PlayerDetails.aspx?TeamID=8010&PlayerID=1824&ID=571
https://www.fivb.org/EN/volleyball/competitions/WorldGrandPrix/2014/Teams2.asp?Team=BEL

1988 births
Living people
Belgian women's volleyball players
Place of birth missing (living people)
Wing spikers
21st-century Belgian women